Taurolema is a genus of longhorn beetles of the subfamily Lamiinae, containing the following species:

 Taurolema albopunctata Gounelle, 1906
 Taurolema bellatrix Thomson, 1860
 Taurolema cicatricosa Lane, 1966
 Taurolema dalensi Touroult & Tavakilian, 2006
 Taurolema duffyi Lane, 1966
 Taurolema flavocincta Gounelle, 1906
 Taurolema hirsuticornis Chevrolat, 1861
 Taurolema nigropilosa Julio, 2003
 Taurolema nigroviolacea Touroult & Tavakilian, 2006
 Taurolema oberthüri Gounelle, 1906
 Taurolema olivacea Gounelle, 1908
 Taurolema pretiosa Chevrolat, 1861
 Taurolema rutilans Gounelle, 1906
 Taurolema seabrai Lane, 1973
 Taurolema superba Fuchs, 1966

References

Mauesiini